In algebraic geometry, a universal homeomorphism is a morphism of schemes  such that, for each morphism , the base change  is a homeomorphism of topological spaces.

A morphism of schemes is a universal homeomorphism if and only if it is integral, radicial and surjective. In particular, a morphism of locally of finite type is a universal homeomorphism if and only if it is finite,  radicial and surjective.

For example, an absolute Frobenius morphism is a universal homeomorphism.

References

External links 
Universal homeomorphisms and the étale topology
Do pushouts along universal homeomorphisms exist?

Homeomorphisms
Morphisms of schemes